A Maclaurin spheroid is an oblate spheroid which arises when a self-gravitating fluid body of uniform density rotates with a constant angular velocity. This spheroid is named after the Scottish mathematician Colin Maclaurin, who formulated it for the shape of Earth in 1742.  In fact the figure of the Earth is far less oblate than Maclaurin's formula suggests, since the Earth is not homogeneous, but has a dense iron core. The Maclaurin spheroid is considered to be the simplest model of rotating ellipsoidal figures in hydrostatic equilibrium since it assumes uniform density.

Maclaurin formula

The formula predicts two possible equilibrium figures when , one is a sphere and the other is a very flattened spheroid. The angular momentum  is

Stability

For a Maclaurin spheroid of eccentricity greater than 0.812670, a Jacobi ellipsoid of the same angular momentum has lower total energy.  If such a spheroid is composed of a viscous fluid, and if it suffers a perturbation which breaks its rotational symmetry, then it will gradually elongate into the Jacobi ellipsoidal form, while dissipating its excess energy as heat.  This is termed secular instability.  However, for a similar spheroid composed of an inviscid fluid, the perturbation will merely result in an undamped oscillation.  This is described as dynamic (or ordinary) stability.

A Maclaurin spheroid of eccentricity greater than 0.952887 is dynamically unstable.  Even if it is composed of an inviscid fluid and has no means of losing energy, a suitable perturbation will grow (at least initially) exponentially.  Dynamic instability implies secular instability (and secular stability implies dynamic stability).

See also
 Jacobi ellipsoid
 Spheroid
 Ellipsoid

References

Quadrics
Astrophysics
Fluid dynamics
Effects of gravitation